Saint-Martin-du-Mont is a commune in the Côte-d'Or department in eastern France.

Geography

Climate
Saint-Martin-du-Mont has a oceanic climate (Köppen climate classification Cfb).

Population

See also
Communes of the Côte-d'Or department

References

Communes of Côte-d'Or